Leucanopsis subnebulosa is a moth of the family Erebidae. It was described by Embrik Strand in 1919. It is found in Brazil.

References

subnebulosa
Moths described in 1919